Akiko Sekiwa (born April 6, 1978 in Tokoro, Hokkaido, Japan as Akiko Katoh) is a Japanese curler and curling coach, a four-time  (1994, 1996, 1997, 1998) and a four-time Japan women's champion (1997, 1998, 1999, 2001).

She played for Japan at the 1998 Winter Olympics, where the Japanese team finished in fifth place. Also, she competed at the 2002 Winter Olympics, where the Japanese team finished in eighth place.

Awards
 All-Star Team, Women:

Teams

Record as a coach of national teams

References

External links
 
 Nagano 1998 - Official Report Vol. 3 (web archive; "Curling" chapter begins at page 236)
 Akiko Kato - Curling - Nihon Olympic Iinkai  (Japanese Olympic Committee - JOC)
 

Living people
1978 births
Sportspeople from Hokkaido
Japanese female curlers
Pacific-Asian curling champions
Japanese curling champions
Curlers at the 1998 Winter Olympics
Curlers at the 2002 Winter Olympics
Olympic curlers of Japan
Japanese curling coaches
20th-century Japanese women
21st-century Japanese women